The Wartburg Knights are the athletic teams that represent Wartburg College, located in Waverly, Iowa. The Knights have varsity teams in 27 sports, 13 for men and 14 for women. The teams participate in Division III of the National Collegiate Athletic Association (NCAA) and are members of the American Rivers Conference. Currently, the school's athletic director is John Cochrane.

Wartburg has had a strong history in athletics at the Division III level.  The Knights wrestling team has an NCAA Division III leading 15 national championships. The Knights also have multiple national championships in both women's indoor track and field(3) and women's outdoor track and field(5), with men's track and field winning one in 2021. The Knights made history in the spring of 2012 when they became the first and only school to win two national titles in one day when both wretling and women's indoor track and field won. In basketball, the Wartburg women have reached the NCAA Final Four on two occasions, most recently in 2018. The men's team has made the Elite Eight once and the Sweet Sixteen on three separate occasions, most recently in 2017. The baseball team has reached the College World Series twice, most recently in 2005. Wartburg's softball team has played in the Women's College World Series once, in 2003.

Championships

NCAA team championships
Wartburg has won 24 NCAA team championships.

Men's (16)
Outdoor Track and Field (1): 2021
Wrestling (15): 1996, 1999, 2003, 2004, 2006, 2008, 2009, 2011, 2012, 2013, 2014, 2016, 2017, 2018, 2022
Women's (8)
Indoor Track and Field (3): 2009, 2010, 2012
Outdoor Track and Field (5): 2005, 2009, 2012, 2013, 2014

Conference championships
Wartburg has 250 American Rivers Conference (ARC) championships:

Men
Baseball (23): 1961, 1962, 1963, 1977, 1978, 1979, 1997, 1998, 1999, 2000, 2001, 2002, 2003, 2004, 2005, 2006, 2007, 2008, 2013, 2015, 2016, 2017
Basketball (21): 1952, 1955, 1959, 1960, 1967, 1968, 1969, 1970, 1971, 1972, 1973, 1974, 1975, 1983, 1987, 1989, 1991, 1993, 2001, 2005, 2006
Cross country (19): 1963, 1967, 1970, 1982, 1991, 1994, 1998, 1999, 2000, 2001, 2002, 2003, 2004, 2005, 2018, 2019, 2020, 2021, 2022 
Football (17): 1958, 1959, 1968, 1982, 1983, 1993, 1999, 2002, 2003, 2004, 2008, 2010, 2013, 2014, 2017, 2018, 2022
Golf (6): 1955, 1960, 1971, 1972, 2004, 2006
Indoor track & field (11): 2003, 2004, 2005, 2006, 2008, 2009, 2012, 2014, 2015, 2019, 2021
Outdoor track & field (10): 1999, 2002, 2003, 2006, 2007, 2008, 2013, 2014, 2017, 2019, 2021
Soccer (5): 2004, 2005, 2006, 2010, 2013
Tennis (1): 1947
Wrestling (38): 1948, 1949, 1950, 1951, 1954, 1960, 1974, 1976, 1977, 1978, 1993, 1994, 1995, 1996, 1997, 1998, 1999, 2000, 2001, 2002, 2003, 2004, 2005, 2006, 2007, 2008, 2009, 2010, 2011, 2012, 2013, 2014, 2015, 2016, 2017, 2018, 2019, 2021, 2022 ,2023
Women
Basketball (10): 1990, 1992, 2001, 2002, 2003, 2017, 2018, 2019, 2020, 2023
Cross country (19): 1991, 1992, 1993, 1994, 1996, 1998, 2001, 2002 , 2005, 2008, 2009, 2011, 2012, 2013, 2014, 2019, 2020, 2021, 2022
Golf (12): 2004, 2005, 2007, 2008, 2009, 2010, 2011, 2012, 2013, 2014, 2015, 2017
Indoor track & field (17): 2003, 2004, 2005, 2006, 2007, 2008, 2009, 2010, 2011, 2012, 2013, 2014, 2015, 2016, 2018, 2020, 2021
Outdoor track & field (23): 1993, 1994, 1995, 2000, 2001, 2002, 2003, 2004, 2005, 2006, 2007, 2008, 2009, 2010, 2011, 2012, 2013, 2014, 2015, 2016, 2017, 2019, 2022
Softball (3): 2001, 2006, 2008
Soccer (4): 2008, 2011, 2015, 2020
Tennis (1):2018
Volleyball (10): 2002, 2012, 2013, 2015, 2016, 2017, 2018, 2019, 2020, 2021

References